Genrikh Karlovich Shults (Schultz — correct transcription; there are most publications with spelling Shults or Shultz (March 23, 1929 – 1999)) was a Russian judoka  and Sambo practitioner who competed for the Soviet Union.

Genrikh Shults was 6-times Champion of the Soviet Union in Sambo (1955, 1956, 1958, 1959, 1960, 1961).

Shults was also a capitan of the first Soviet National Judo team.

In 1962 he won the bronze medal in European Judo Team Championships (Essen) in class O80, and in 1963 he won the gold medal in the European Judo Team Championships (Geneva) in U80 class.

In 1956 Shults found a Sambo club in Moscow High Technical School.

Genrikh Shults among with Oleg Stepanov (U68), Vladimir Pankratov (U80) and Durmishkhan Beruashvili (O80) took part in the pre-Olympics Soviet-Japanese Judo tournament in Japan (1963).

After finishing his sport career Genrikh Shults returned to teach Sambo in Moscow High Technical School for more than 40 years. He trained several European-class Sambo players and judokas.

In 1999 Genrikh Shults died in Moscow at age 70.

Every year, at 23 of March (in Shults's Birthday), an All-Russian Sambo Competition in Memory of Genrikh Shults takes place in Moscow.

Sport club "Sambo-Judo" in Bauman Moscow State Technical University was named after Genrikh Shults.

References

External links
 
  Black Belt, February 1967. 64 pages, V. 5; № 2 , p. 12. Russia prepares to export Sambo

1929 births
1999 deaths
Soviet male judoka
Russian sambo practitioners
Russian male judoka
Honoured Masters of Sport of the USSR